
Gmina Krotoszyn is an urban-rural gmina (administrative district) in Krotoszyn County, Greater Poland Voivodeship, in west-central Poland.

Villages
Apart from the town of Krotoszyn, Gmina Krotoszyn contains the villages and settlements of Baszyny, Benice, Biadki, Bór, Bożacin, Brzezinka, Brzoza, Chwaliszew, Dąbrowa, Durzyn, Duszna Górka, Dzierżanów, Gorzupia, Janów, Jasne Pole, Jastrzębiec, Jaźwiny, Jelonek, Kobierno, Łówkówiec, Lutogniew, Miłowiec, Nowy Folwark, Odrodzenie, Orpiszew, Osusz, Pustkowie Jędrzejewskie, Raciborów, Romanów, Roszki, Rozdrażewek, Różopole, Rudy, Ryczków, Salnia, Sędziszew, Smoszew, Sokołówka, Stare Budy, Stary Las, Świnków, Teresiny, Tomnice, Ugrzele, Unisław, Ustków, Wielowieś, Witki, Wronów and Wróżewy.

Neighbouring gminas
Gmina Krotoszyn is bordered by the town of Sulmierzyce and by the gminas of Dobrzyca, Kobylin, Koźmin Wielkopolski, Ostrów Wielkopolski, Pogorzela, Raszków, Rozdrażew and Zduny.

References
Polish official population figures 2006

Krotoszyn
Krotoszyn County